SUPER73 is an American lifestyle adventure brand and manufacturer of electric bicycles based in Irvine, California. It is best known for its product line of motorcycle styled electric bicycles, custom bicycle builds for celebrities, and high profile e-bike collaborations.

History

2016 
SUPER73 was founded in 2016 by John Kim, Michael Cannavo, and Aaron P. Wong along with Alix Armour and Legrand Crewse. The company started as a Kickstarter crowdfunding campaign promising a premium electric bicycle called the "Super73" for a $25k fundraising goal. The bikes designed and built by Kim along with the viral promotional video by Cannavo resulted in a highly successful crowd funding campaign which generated over $441k from backers. The nostalgic design defined a new bicycle category (electric motorbike) and along with features like a built in bottle opener was positively received by design and fashion magazines worldwide.

2017 
In 2017, the company started to earn a reputation as a social media collaborator with celebrities like Will Smith, Coco Rocha Casey Neistat, and Jesse Wellens. Most notably, they built Star Wars Return of the Jedi themed speeder bikes and costumes to film a Star Wars cosplay video that went viral on YouTube, which further cemented Super73 as “The Content Creator’s Bike”.

On July 10, 2017, the company announced a second model, the SUPER73-S1. It featured a 500 watt rear wheel hub motor, a motorcycle fuel tank styled battery, and LED headlight. To avoid confusion between the original Super73 model, the Scout was renamed the SG1, while the original model was renamed the OG1. Also with the launch of the SG1, the company announced the sale of the limited “Rose Ave” edition, which was the first of their product collaborations done with a celebrity, Jesse Wellens.

2018 
On Nov.11, 2018, the company launched a third model to their product line, the Z model. The Z model was significant because it had a retail price of US$1,000, making it affordable to a wider audience. Along with the expansion of their product line up, the company received $8.75million USD in investment and started sales in Europe. Also in May 2018, the American actor and rapper, Will Smith, launched an Instagram video showcasing the Super73. The video went viral, further cementing the company's reputation for collaborating with celebrities.

2019 
In 2019, the company continued to collaborate with notable celebrities and brands. On Nov.4, 2019, the company announced a limited edition Z1 model, which was cobranded with the Parisian football club, Paris Saint Germain. The launch of the limited edition PSG model, coincided with the 50th anniversary of the legendary football team.

2020 
In Feb 2020, Super73 launched their R model. The new R model was significant because it was the first model with a full suspension on the front and rear wheels. This was a departure from their earlier models, which were known for their rigid frames and lack of suspension on their rear wheels.

Later that year, Super73 raised a $20-million Series B funding round led by Boston-based growth equity firm Volition Capital.

2021 
In 2021, the company produced several high-profile collaborations that included an off-road motorcycle inspired e-bike with famed motorcycle racer and designer Roland Sands, a special edition Hot Wheels x Super73 with American toymaker Mattel, and a limited-edition haute couture e-bike collaboration with Parisan fashion house, Yves Saint Laurent.

Models

References

Electric bicycles